James Ervin Staggs (September 1, 1948 – December 29, 2012) was an American professional basketball player. He played in the American Basketball Association for the Miami Floridians during the 1969–70 season and averaged 8.5 points, 2.3 rebounds, and 1.4 assists per game. Staggs played college basketball at both North Carolina A&T and Cheyney.

References

1948 births
2012 deaths
American men's basketball players
Basketball players from Philadelphia
Cheyney Wolves men's basketball players
Miami Floridians players
North Carolina A&T Aggies men's basketball players
Small forwards